Porsche India Pvt Ltd is a division of the German automobile manufacturer Porsche and the Volkswagen Group India. Founded in 2004, with headquarters in Mumbai.

Porsche India currently imports and sells the Boxster, Cayman, 911, Panamera, Macan and Cayenne.

History & sales 

Porsche has been selling luxury cars in India since 2004, delivering a total of 1,052 units to the customers in India, out of which 85 percent are Cayenne SUV models. 
In order to become the leading automobile luxury brand in the Indian automotive market, Porsche had established Porsche India as its division.
As of January 2013, the company planned to extend its sale in India by establishing new centers in India.

Porsche Centres 
 Delhi
 Kochi
 Mumbai
 Bangalore 
 Ahmedabad
 Chandigarh
 Chennai

Volkswagen Group as an importer 

As the company received positive response from customers in the Porsche India range, Porsche has appointed its parent company Volkswagen Group, as the official importer of its cars in India.

See also 
Audi India
BMW India
Mercedes-Benz India
Lexus India

References

External links
 Porsche.in

Porsche
Vehicle manufacturing companies established in 2004
Indian subsidiaries of foreign companies